Anne Scott-Pendlebury (also known as Anne Pendlebury) is an Australian television, film and theatre actress. She played the role of Hilary Robinson in the soap opera Neighbours.

Career
Scott-Pendlebury is the daughter of L. Scott Pendlebury and Eleanor "Nornie" Gude; both were artists. She is the sister of Andrew Pendlebury, a musician. Scott-Pendlebury began her career working in theatre with the Melbourne Theatre Company.  In 1970, she took the role of Ariel in the Victorian Shakespeare Company production of The Tempest. In 1983, Scott-Pendlebury played Hermione in The Winter's Tale and Natasha in The Three Sisters. In 1984, she continued her work with the Melbourne Theatre Company, playing a secretary role in the play Candida and directing the production of The Doctor.

Filmography

References

External links
 

Australian film actresses
Australian stage actresses
Australian soap opera actresses
Living people
Year of birth missing (living people)
Actresses from Melbourne